"Breathe" is a song by American singer Michelle Branch. It was released on September 22, 2003, in the United States as the second single from her second studio album, Hotel Paper (2003). The song peaked at  36 on the US Billboard Hot 100 in December 2003 and reached number 45 in Australia

Chart performance
"Breathe" peaked at number 36 on the US Billboard Hot 100 on the week ending December 13, 2003. The song stayed on the chart for 18 weeks and became Branch's sixth top-40 hit.

Music video
Directed by Marc Klasfeld, the video shows Branch playing with her band inside a house. Bit by bit, the house, as well as everything in it, begins to dissolve, revealing a sunny beach outside. Eventually, Branch tosses her guitar out to sea and she and her band finish playing at the beach.

Track listings

 US CD maxi-single
 "Breathe" (album version) – 3:31
 "Breathe" (The Passengers Tuff Club) – 8:03
 "Breathe" (Chris Cox Penetrating club mix) – 8:56
 "Breathe" (Sean Konnery Resportator club mix) - 6:57
 "Breathe" (Dave Hernandez club mix) – 7:26
 "Breathe" (High Bias radio mix) – 3:46
 "Breathe" (The Passengerz Tuff Radio) – 3:59
 "Breathe" (Sean Konnery Resportator radio edit) – 4:10

 Australian CD single
 "Breathe"
 "'Till I Get Over You" (acoustic live)
 "Desperately" (acoustic live)

Charts

Release history

In popular culture
 "Breathe" is featured in the trailers for P.S. I Love You, Sex and the City, The Prince and Me, and 13 Going on 30.
"Breathe" is featured on an episode of MTV's The Girls of Hedsor Hall and the Sex and the City episode, "The Catch".

References

2003 singles
2003 songs
Maverick Records singles
Michelle Branch songs
Music videos directed by Marc Klasfeld
Song recordings produced by John Shanks
Songs written by John Shanks
Songs written by Michelle Branch